The 1873 Invercargill by-election was a by-election during the 5th New Zealand Parliament in the Southland electorate of Invercargill. The by-election occurred following the resignation of MP William Henderson Calder and was won by John Cuthbertson.

Background
William Henderson Calder, who was first elected to represent Invercargill in the 1871 election, resigned in 1873. This triggered the Invercargill by-election, which was held on 22 May 1873. Two independent candidates contested the election, John Cuthbertson and William Wood. Cuthbertson obtained 52.48% of the votes and was successful.

Previous election

Results

See also
List of New Zealand by-elections
1878 Invercargill by-election
1930 Invercargill by-election

References

1873 elections in New Zealand
Invercargill 1873
Politics of Southland, New Zealand